Martina Müller (born 18 April 1980) is a retired German footballer. She played as a striker for VfL Wolfsburg and the German national team.

Career

Club
Müller had played at several smaller clubs at youth level, before joining the reigning German champions FSV Frankfurt in 1998. Because many of club's star players, such as Birgit Prinz and Sandra Smisek, had left that summer, Müller immediately became a regular starter and helped the team avoid relegation. After two years, she moved to SC 07 Bad Neuenahr, where she played for four seasons. In 2005, she joined VfL Wolfsburg, at a time when the club had just been relegated to the second division. With 36 goals, Müller was the second Bundesliga top-scorer the following season, helping Wolfsburg to achieve immediate promotion back to the German top flight.

Müller remained with Wolfsburg in their 2012–13 breakout season, when they won a treble of Bundesliga, DFB-Pokal and UEFA Women's Champions League. In May 2013's Champions League final at Stamford Bridge Müller scored the decisive penalty kick to defeat Olympique Lyonnais 1–0. The result halted Lyon's 118–match unbeaten run and stopped the French team winning a third successive continental title.

On 13 April 2015 she announced that she would retire at the end of the 2014–15 season.

International 

Müller made her debut for the German national team against the United States in July 2000. In the following years, she won several major titles with Germany, almost exclusively as a reserve player, often coming on as a late substitute. Müller won her first international trophy at the 2001 European Championship. Two years later, she was part of Germany's winning team at the 2003 FIFA Women's World Cup. She had three appearances and scored twice in the tournament.

At the 2004 Summer Olympics, Müller claimed the bronze medal. She again became world champion at the 2007 FIFA Women's World Cup, where she played in four matches, coming from the bench in all of them. She scored Germany's third goal in the semi-final against Norway. Müller won the European Championship a second time with Germany in 2009, and was called up for the 2011 FIFA Women's World Cup squad.

International goals
Scores and results list Germany's goal tally first:

Source:

Honours

Domestic

 Bundesliga: Winner (2) 2012-13, 2013-14
 DFB-Pokal: Winner (2) 2012-13, 2014-15

International

 FIFA World Cup: Winner (2) 2003, 2007
 UEFA European Championship: Winner (2) 2001, 2009
 Olympic bronze medal: (1) 2004
 UEFA Women's Champions League:  Winner (2) 2012–13, 2013–14

Individual 
 Silbernes Lorbeerblatt: 2003, 2007
 German Women's Footballer of the Year: 2013

References

External links

Profile at VfL Wolfsburg
Profile at the German Football Federation  
Profile at Weltfussball.de  

1980 births
Living people
German women's footballers
Germany women's international footballers
2003 FIFA Women's World Cup players
2007 FIFA Women's World Cup players
SC 07 Bad Neuenahr players
Footballers at the 2004 Summer Olympics
Olympic bronze medalists for Germany
Sportspeople from Kassel
VfL Wolfsburg (women) players
FSV Frankfurt (women) players
Olympic medalists in football
2011 FIFA Women's World Cup players
FIFA Women's World Cup-winning players
FIFA Century Club
Women's association football forwards
Medalists at the 2004 Summer Olympics
Footballers from Hesse
Olympic footballers of Germany
UEFA Women's Championship-winning players